The Blue Bird Vision is a school bus that is manufactured and marketed by Blue Bird Corporation in North America and exported worldwide. In production since 2003, the Vision became the first cowled-chassis bus built on a proprietary chassis designed and manufactured by the same company. While it is sold primarily in a school bus configuration, the Blue Bird Vision is also offered with various commercial and specialty seating and design configurations.

The Vision is produced by Blue Bird Corporation in its Fort Valley, Georgia manufacturing facility alongside its Blue Bird All American product line. Prior to 2014, the Blue Bird Vision was also produced in LaFayette, Georgia; this facility is now closed.

Background  

In the early 2000s, Blue Bird Corporation was in a need to find a reliable source of chassis supplier for its Blue Bird Conventional Type C buses. At the time, a 1991 supply agreement with General Motors was set to expire at the end of 2003 with little signs of renewal. Although many company customers made use of Navistar-sourced chassis for the Blue Bird Conventional, in 1995, Navistar became the parent company of Blue Bird competitor AmTran (renamed IC Corporation in 2001). Freightliner, the parent company of Thomas Built Buses, ended its chassis supply to all competitors after 2000.

As a response to its situation, Blue Bird began development of a next-generation Blue Bird Conventional. In collaboration with Ford Motor Company, Blue Bird designed a bus using a Ford F-650 Super Duty medium-duty truck chassis. Introduced in 2000, the F-650 had yet to see use in cowled-chassis applications. Several prototypes were constructed, developing several all-new features previously unseen on school buses; key to this was a wide-angle lens next to the entry door to increase loading-zone visibility. By the end of 2002, however, production plans for Ford-based Blue Bird Conventionals failed to materialize.

Although the Blue Bird/Ford never reached production, Blue Bird chose to develop the concept further. As with its All American, TC/2000, TC/1000, Wanderlodge, and Q-Bus product lines, Blue Bird developed its own chassis for the vehicle. Though sharing nearly its entire body with its Conventional predecessor, the Vision developed advances for the driver in terms of driver sightlines in the critical loading-zone area. Eliminating a major blind spot, the patented Safety View™ Vision Panel ahead of the entry door is a wide-angled Fresnel lens made from laminated glass.

Design history
As of 2018 production, the Blue Bird Vision has been produced in three distinct generations. For 2008, the Vision chassis underwent a major redesign, with a second update introduced for 2015 production (though released in mid-2013). Though built on a proprietary chassis, the Vision continued the use of the basic Blue Bird Conventional body structure, introduced in 1957.

2003–2007

In 2003, the Vision made its debut for 2004 production (the Conventional remained solely on Navistar chassis, becoming the SBCV in 2005). Upon the introduction of the Vision, Blue Bird became the first American body manufacturer to design a cowled chassis for its bus bodies; previously, in-house chassis were reserved for transit-style school buses.

As it would serve no other purpose beyond bus use, Blue Bird optimized the exterior of the Vision to maximize forward visibility; the hood was sharply angled from the base of the windshield, as were the front fenders. The 2003 Vision featured a 50° wheel cut, for improved maneuverability over previous Type C buses. The instrument panel featured large back-lit gauges and switches. The Blue Bird "Handy Bus" option package specified wheelchair lifts and flat-floor interiors. The Vision was available in standard (72") or high (77") headroom.

From 2003 to 2005, the Vision came with the Caterpillar C7 engine as standard equipment, and in 2006, the Cummins ISB became an option.

2008–2014

For the 2008 model year, Blue Bird made a number of updates to the Vision. While the bus body itself remained unchanged, the hood design saw an extensive redesign. To increase space and improve engine cooling required for lower-emissions engines, the sharply angled hood was replaced by a more aerodynamic design that offered a larger grille. In another move, the hood design also moved the Blue Bird emblem from the back of the hood sides directly onto the grille. Several changes to the Vision would reflect the connection of Blue Bird to Volvo in the early 2000s; rather than sourcing parts from the All American, the 2008 Vision would source a number of parts from Volvo trucks (headlights, steering column, and instrument cluster). Along with the traditional manual and air-powered service doors, an electric-powered service door became an option.

As Blue Bird unveiled the Vision in November 2006, the company also previewed a prototype Type C bus using the same chassis. The Blue Bird EC-72 was designed as a school bus with a lower production cost than the Vision, primarily through the simplification of its overall design and lack of customization. 28 prototypes were produced, but the EC-72 has yet to enter full-scale production.

In 2009, the Vision became the first factory-produced school bus equipped with a propane-fueled powertrain. In place of the diesel engine, the propane-fueled version used a GM 8.1L Vortec V8 engine with a propane system developed by CleanFuel USA. Previous school buses fueled by propane were aftermarket conversions (typically of the Chevrolet/GMC B series bus chassis). As Caterpillar ended on-road engine production, the C9 diesel was discontinued at the end of the model year.

For 2011, Blue Bird made several detail changes to the Vision. On the outside, the exterior design of the rub rails was changed slightly. To increase parts commonality with the All American, the Vision was given the instrument cluster and steering column introduced with the newly redesigned All American D3. The propane-fuel Vision saw major changes related to its powertrain. Following the discontinuation of the GM 8.1L V8 in 2010, Blue Bird began a partnership with both Ford Motor Company and ROUSH CleanTech. The end result of the partnership was the propane Vision equipped with a 362 hp Ford 6.8L V10 and Ford 6-speed automatic transmission.

In 2013, a detail change saw the deletion of the namesake Safety View™ Vision Panel forward of the entry door.

2015–present
In July 2013, Blue Bird unveiled a number of changes to the Vision conventional at the School Transportation News Expo trade show. Designated as a 2015 model, the updated Vision entered production in October 2013. Distinguished by a redesigned grille with a larger Blue Bird emblem, a number of changes were made to the exterior lighting. Another distinguishing exterior feature was the roof stripe. In a change made to all Blue Birds, the full-length roof stripe was replaced by a shortened design of a single length. The Volvo-sourced headlamp clusters were replaced with single-piece clear-lens units; the change was intended to simplify beam adjustment. To lower the risk of burned-out lights, all clearance lights on the Vision were changed to LED bulbs (a change also made to the All American). 77 inches became the sole option for roof height as well. For the interior, the drivers compartment saw fewer substantial revisions, with the drivers' seat receiving a height-adjustable seatbelt; another option included a rear-view backup camera.

To further increase the appeal of the propane-fueled Vision, for 2015 production, Blue Bird introduced an optional 98-gallon extended-range fuel tank (standard equipment being 67 gallons).

In 2016, the powertrain lineup for the Vision saw several introductions. Alongside the propane-fueled Ford V10, development of more Roush CleanTech fuel systems led to the introduction of gasoline and compressed natural gas (CNG) variants of the Vision.  The gasoline variant marked the first time since 2003 that a full-size school bus was available with a gasoline engine (the last example being the 2003 Blue Bird/GM CV200).

For 2017 production, the Cummins diesel lineup was expanded by the introduction of the Cummins ISV5.0 turbodiesel 5.0L V8 (as seen in the Nissan Titan XD). For the Cummins ISB6.7, the 7-speed Eaton Procision dual-clutch transmission became an option. Blue Bird announced an electric version of the Vision in late 2017 that entered limited (special order only) production in 2018 and mass production 2019.  

For 2021, production of the Ford Modular Engine was discontinued and the 7.3L Godzilla V8 was introduced in a gasoline and propane option. 

For 2022, Cummins introduced the B6.7L in propane and natural gas options.

Powertrain

As with its Blue Bird Conventional predecessor, the Blue Bird Vision is offered with a diesel-fuel engine as standard equipment. Currently, the Cummins B6.7 diesel is standard, alongside the Cummins V5.0 diesel.

Coinciding with other alternative-fuel vehicles from the company, the Blue Bird Vision is offered with propane/LPG, compressed natural gas, and gasoline.  For 2019, a battery-electric drivetrain became an option for the model line.

Comparable products 
 IC Bus CE-Series
 Thomas Saf-T-Liner C2.                        International 3300 chassis

References 

 Vision School Bus Specification Sheet
 Propane Bus Spec Sheet
 Blue Bird Vision - Product Information
 Blue Bird Vision - Propane - Product Information

External links 

School buses
Vision
Vehicles introduced in 2003
School bus chassis